In the mathematical field of graph theory, an Archimedean graph is a graph that forms the skeleton of one of the Archimedean solids. There are 13 Archimedean graphs, and all of them are regular, polyhedral (and therefore by necessity also 3-vertex-connected planar graphs), and also Hamiltonian graphs.

Along with the 13, the set of infinite prism graphs and antiprism graphs can also be considered Archimedean graphs.

See also 
Platonic graph
Wheel graph

References

 Read, R. C. and Wilson, R. J. An Atlas of Graphs, Oxford, England: Oxford University Press, 2004 reprint, Chapter 6 special graphs pp. 261, 267-269.

External links
 

Regular graphs
Planar graphs